Porba  is a village situated in the Phek District of the Indian state of Nagaland, 70 km away from the state capital, Kohima and 10 km from Pfütsero. It has a population of about 2800. Most of its inhabitants practices paddy and terrace cultivation. Porba is the only village in Nagaland which celebrates the Fish festival (Pfü Nyi/Khilü Nyi) annually on the 15th of November.

References

External links

Villages in Phek district